Morris Island is an ice-covered island about  long, lying  west of Farmer Island in the Sulzberger Ice Shelf of Antarctica.

See also 
 List of Antarctic and sub-Antarctic islands

References

Islands of Marie Byrd Land

nn:Morris Island